In mathematical logic, the Cantor–Dedekind axiom is the thesis that the real numbers are order-isomorphic to the linear continuum of geometry. In other words, the axiom states that there is a one-to-one correspondence between real numbers and points on a line.

This axiom is the cornerstone of analytic geometry. The Cartesian coordinate system developed by René Descartes implicitly assumes this axiom by blending the distinct concepts of real number system with the geometric line or plane into a conceptual metaphor. This is sometimes referred to as the real number line blend.

A consequence of this axiom is that Alfred Tarski's proof of the decidability of first-order theories of the real numbers could be seen as an algorithm to solve any first-order problem in Euclidean geometry.

However, with the development of axiom systems for synthetic geometry that filled in the axioms that Euclid implicitly assumed, and the development of modern notions of the real numbers, both the Euclidean line and the Reals are complete Archimedean fields,  thus canonically isomorphic, and the Cantor–Dedekind "axiom" is actually a theorem.

Notes

References 

 Ehrlich, P. (1994). "General introduction". Real Numbers, Generalizations of the Reals, and Theories of Continua, vi–xxxii. Edited by P. Ehrlich, Kluwer Academic Publishers, Dordrecht
 Bruce E. Meserve (1953) 
 B.E. Meserve (1955) 

Real numbers
Mathematical axioms